João de Barros is a neighborhood in the city of Recife, in the state of Pernambuco in Brazil.

The population in 2010 was 9138 inhabitants, with a male population of 4,310 (10.4) inhabitants and a female population of 5,200 (14,22) inhabitants, according to data from the 2010 Census conducted by the Brazilian Institute of Geography and Statistics (IBGE).

References

Neighbourhoods of Recife
Pernambuco